The stout sandslider  (Lerista griffini)  is a species of skink found in the Northern Territory and Western Australia.

References

Lerista
Reptiles described in 1982
Taxa named by Glen Milton Storr